The 1971 Eastern Michigan Hurons football team represented Eastern Michigan University as an independent during the 1971 NCAA College Division football season. In their fifth season under head coach Dan Boisture, the Hurons compiled a 7–1–2 record and outscored their opponents, 228 to 85. Dave Pureifory was the team captain. The Hurons were undefeated in the regular season, were ranked No. 3 in the NCAA College Division, allowed only one touchdown in the last five games, and advanced to the College Division quarterfinals. In the first bowl game in the program's 79-year existence, the Hurons lost to Louisiana Tech in the inaugural Pioneer Bowl in Wichita Falls, Texas, by a score of 14 to 3. Houston Booth was the team's starting quarterback.

Schedule

References

Eastern Michigan
Eastern Michigan Eagles football seasons
Eastern Michigan Hurons football